Lois Jean Stratton (January 5, 1927 – September 11, 2020) was an American politician in the state of Washington. Stratton served in the Washington House of Representatives as a Democrat from the 3rd district from 1979 to 1985, succeeding Margaret Hurley. She also served in the Washington State Senate from 1985 to 1993, succeeding Hurley once again. A member of the Spokane Tribe, Stratton was the first female enrolled tribal member in the Washington State Legislature.

Career
She worked as a secretary, and is an alumnus of Kinman Business University.

Political career
Stratton unsuccessfully ran for mayor of Spokane in 1993.

Personal life
She was married with five children, including Spokane City Councilmember Karen Stratton.

She died on September 11, 2020, in Spokane, Washington at age 93.

References

1927 births
2020 deaths
Democratic Party members of the Washington House of Representatives
Native American state legislators in Washington (state)
Native American women in politics
People from Stevens County, Washington
Politicians from Spokane, Washington
Democratic Party Washington (state) state senators
Women state legislators in Washington (state)
Spokane people
21st-century American women